Joao Alberto Grimaldo Ubidia (born 20 February 2003) is a Peruvian footballer who plays as a forward for Sporting Cristal.

Career statistics

Club

Notes

References

2003 births
Living people
Footballers from Lima
Peruvian footballers
Peru youth international footballers
Association football forwards
Esther Grande footballers
Sporting Cristal footballers
Peruvian Primera División players
Peru under-20 international footballers